Serruria collina, also known as the lost spiderhead, is a flower-bearing shrub that belongs to the genus Serruria and forms part of the fynbos. The plant is native to the Western Cape. 

References

External links 
 Threatened Species Programme | SANBI Red List of South African Plants
 Serruria collina (Lost spiderhead)
 Curly Spiderheads

collina